Quddus King well known as GMK, is a Nigerian record producer, sound engineer, rapper, and songwriter. He is best known for producing Bridge's "Needy", and "Searching", Cruel Santino "Gangstar Fear", Lady Donli "Cash", BOJ's "Awolowo", "Bill Up", and "Assignment", and Burna Boy "Different". The Grammy-nominated Best World Music Album African Giant by Burna Boy in 2019, earned him a special recognition from The Recording Academy. He is signed to Warner Chappell Music, and Love Renaissance.

He is a member of the Monster Boys collective, with Cruel Santino, and music producers Genio Bambino.

Early life

He studied Audio Engineering, in United Kingdom from SAE Institute London.

Career
GMK is an acronym for "Grand Master King". In 2013, he launched his career on SoundCloud, as a rapper, following the release of "Sounds Of The Future", featuring Cruel Santino (credited as Ozzy B) & Yung from the music group L.O.S. On 24 April 2016, he released his extended play Long Live the King, exclusively on SoundCloud, with guest appearances from Odunsi (The Engine), Genio Bambino, Bridge, BrisB, and Cruel Santino. In a review for Pulse Nigeria, Abiola wrote "Long Live The King is a pleasing story-telling work of art by ThatBoyGMK that would leave you wanting more". The Culture Custodian included the extended play in their list of 10 debut projects from 2016 you should bump!, in 2017.

On 16 December 2016, he released "WasteMan", independently on SoundCloud. The music video was released the same day, and directed by Falomo, in Lagos, Nigeria. On 9 February 2017, The Native included the song in their Bumplist of 10 essentials you must-haves this week. On 21 March 2017, GMK released "Coconut lips", featuring Tomi Thomas. On 24 May 2017, he released "Pears & Mangos", and released "OTB", on 23 July 2017. In the same year, he opened for Cruel Santino, and Wavy the Creator, at The Lucid Lemons Curd 2 music and art showcase, held in Lagos, on August 5, 2017. He released "Lagbaja" featuring Odunsi (The Engine), on 20 November 2017.

GMK was on YNaija New Establishment class of 2019. The music video for Odunsi "Star Signs" was directed by The Candles, with cameo appearances from GMK. On 17 February 2021, following the partnership between Warner Chappell Music, and Love Renaissance, Monster Boys collective signed a publishing deal with Warner Chappell Music.

Personal life
Quddus King is the son of Kolawole King and the Nigerian actress Carol King.

Discography

Extended plays

Production discography

Albums produced

Accolades

References

Living people
Nigerian songwriters
Nigerian rappers
Nigerian hip hop record producers
Nigerian hip hop singers
Nigerian record producers
Year of birth missing (living people)